Daffy Duck and Porky Pig Meet the Groovie Goolies is a 1972 animated one-hour TV-movie (with a live-action segment near the end) that was aired on December 16 as an episode of the anthology series The ABC Saturday Superstar Movie. In this Filmation-produced movie, Daffy Duck, Porky Pig, and other Looney Tunes characters interact with the characters from the Filmation series Groovie Goolies.

This movie is notable for being the one and only time that Warner Bros. "loaned out" their famous Looney Tunes characters to appear in a Filmation production (otherwise they were a silent partner). Warner Bros. had shut down their animation studio in 1969. While Warner Bros. had outsourced production to other companies since the 1960s, it was usually to studios run by former Warner Bros. alumni (such as Friz Freleng and later Chuck Jones), something that was not the case with Filmation.

Synopsis 
Daffy Duck is in Hollywood producing a movie about King Arthur and the Knights of the Round Table, starring himself; also appearing in the film are Porky Pig, Petunia Pig (in her first on-screen appearance since the 1930s), Sylvester, Tweety, Wile E. Coyote (without his usual foil the Road Runner), Pepé Le Pew, Elmer Fudd, Yosemite Sam, Foghorn Leghorn, and Charlie Dog. (Bugs Bunny, the usual foil of Elmer and Sam, was absent.)

At Horrible Hall, the Groovie Goolies are watching a television interview in which Daffy is talking about his new movie, when their program is interrupted by a ghoulish being calling himself The Phantom of the Flickers; he announces his intention to destroy every film that Daffy Duck and the company ever made, including their current King Arthur film. Being a huge fan of Daffy, Frankie goes to Hollywood to offer his help, and the other Horrible Hall residents go along with him.

Mayhem ensues when the Looney Tunes and the Goolies first meet, but they eventually settle down and continue filming the movie. But when the Phantom disguises himself as each of the Goolies, Daffy and the others then think that they are in league with the Phantom and run off. The Phantom suddenly grabs the film and, disguised as Hauntleroy, tries to escape from the Goolies by running through a magic mirror into "Mad Mirror Land" (where the animation shifts to live action, stop-motion pixilation). Frankie, Drac, and Wolfie chase after him, and after a cartoonishly slapstick pursuit they bring (or more rather sneeze) the Phantom and the film back to the hand-drawn animated world.

The Phantom turns out to be Drac’s long-lost uncle Claude Chaney, a formerly famous silent film actor. Chaney's pale complexion left him out of work when color films became popular. Daffy, impressed with Chaney's disguise skills, gives Claude a job. King Arthur wins an Ozzie Award, and the Goolies head for home.

Cast

Voice actors 
 Mel Blanc . . . Daffy Duck, Porky Pig, Elmer J. Fudd, Yosemite Sam, Sylvester, Tweety, Wile E. Coyote, Pepé Le Pew, Foghorn Leghorn
 Jane Webb (credited as "Joanne Louise") . . . Petunia Pig, Nurse  
 Howard Morris . . . Franklin "Frankie" Frankenstein, Wolfgang "Wolfie" Wolfman, Mummy, "Hauntleroy"
 Larry Storch . . . Count Tom Dracula, Hagatha, Claude Chaney/Phantom of the Flickers
 Dallas McKennon (uncredited) . . . Sylvester J. Pussycat (meowing sounds), Charlie Dog, Marshall Actor, Messenger, Singing Telegram Horse, Announcer, Horses
 Lou Scheimer (uncredited) . . . Director, Lance, Dog, Herald

Live actors 
The following (uncredited) actors appeared in the live-action segment:
 Ed Fournier . . . Franklin "Frankie" Frankenstein
 Emory Gordy Jr. . . . "Hauntleroy"
 Dick Monda . . . Count Tom Dracula
 Jeffrey Thomas . . . Wolfgang "Wolfie" Wolfman

Availability 
This movie has never been officially released on home video in the United States (due to various rights issues), but traders on the Internet have been recording and selling DVDs of this film, most of which were originally black-and-white kinescopes of the original broadcast.

Distributor Select Video released the film in a number of European countries. The German version of the movie was released in 1983 as Groovie Goolies: Muntere Monster in Hollywood ("Groovie Goolies: Groovie Goolies in Hollywood"), and re-released in 1986 as Duffy Duck und Co. ("Daffy Duck and Co."), and again in 1990 as Die Lustige Monster Show: Duffy Duck und Co. in Hollywood ("Groovie Goolies: Daffy Duck and Co. in Hollywood"). The original laugh track from the movie was removed for these releases. In January 1985, the movie was released by Select Video in the UK as Groovie Ghouls, and was on sale at Woolworth's. In those instances, the live-action sequence was not present, and it was replaced by an out-of-shot collision before rejoining the original animated sequence. The sequence in these releases was cut for time, as the German versions contained trailers for other Select Video titles.

Another notable feature of the German and UK releases was that the Select Video ident was shorter, and had no jingle. In addition, the end credits were different, as they had to edit out the names of the actors in the live-action sequence which was not included, and also had other credits, presumably for Europe-based post-production at Select Video.

Despite the aforementioned rights issues, the film remains part of the Groovie Goolies syndication package (split into two half-hours), as of the mid 2000s, and has been rebroadcast several times on television. Sky One broadcast the movie on July 4, 1992. USA Network broadcast the movie as a Halloween special in the mid to late 90s shortly before it stopped broadcasting cartoons altogether. In 1997, Cartoon Network broadcast the movie on Mr. Spim's Cartoon Theatre. A two-part version of the movie was broadcast on German television as Monsterparty auf Schloß Blutenburg: Daffy Duck und das Phantom Der Seifenoper ("Groovie Goolies: Daffy Duck and the Phantom of the Flickers") in 2002, 2007 and 2013.

References

External links 
 
 
 Jim's Daffy Duck and Porky Pig Meet the Groovie Goolies page
 Cartoon Research FAQ-2

1970s American animated films
1970s animated television specials
1972 animated films
1972 films
1972 television films
The ABC Saturday Superstar Movie
American films with live action and animation
American television films
Animated crossover films
Animated films directed by Hal Sutherland
Filmation animated films
Daffy Duck films
Porky Pig films
Sylvester the Cat films
Tweety films
Looney Tunes films
Warner Bros. animated films
Films produced by Lou Scheimer